Trichothiodystrophy (TTD) is an autosomal recessive inherited disorder characterised by brittle hair and intellectual impairment. The word breaks down into tricho – "hair", thio – "sulphur", and dystrophy – "wasting away" or literally "bad nourishment". TTD is associated with a range of symptoms connected with organs of the ectoderm and neuroectoderm. TTD may be subclassified into four syndromes: Approximately half of all patients with trichothiodystrophy have photosensitivity, which divides the classification into syndromes with or without photosensitivity; BIDS and PBIDS, and IBIDS and PIBIDS. Modern covering usage is TTD-P (photosensitive), and TTD.

Presentation
Features of TTD can include photosensitivity, ichthyosis, brittle hair and nails,  intellectual impairment, decreased fertility and short stature. A more subtle feature associated with this syndrome is a "tiger tail" banding pattern in hair shafts, seen in microscopy under polarized light. The acronyms PIBIDS, IBIDS, BIDS and PBIDS give the initials of the words involved. BIDS syndrome, also called Amish brittle hair brain syndrome and hair-brain syndrome, is an autosomal recessive inherited disease. It is nonphotosensitive. BIDS is characterized by brittle hair, intellectual impairment, decreased fertility, and short stature. There is a photosensitive syndrome, PBIDS.

BIDS is associated with the gene MPLKIP (TTDN1). IBIDS syndrome, following the acronym from ichthyosis, brittle hair and nails, intellectual impairment and short stature, is the Tay syndrome or sulfur-deficient brittle hair syndrome, first described by Tay in 1971. (Chong Hai Tay was the Singaporean doctor who was the first doctor in South East Asia to have a disease named after him.) Tay syndrome should not be confused with the Tay–Sachs disease.  It is an autosomal recessive congenital disease. In some cases, it can be diagnosed prenatally. IBIDS syndrome is nonphotosensitive.

Cause
The photosensitive form is referred to as PIBIDS, and is associated with ERCC2 and ERCC3.

Photosensitive forms
All photosensitive TTD syndromes have defects in the nucleotide excision repair (NER) pathway, which is a vital DNA repair system that removes many kinds of DNA lesions. This defect is not present in the nonphotosensitive TTD's. These type of defects can result in other rare autosomal recessive diseases like xeroderma pigmentosum and Cockayne syndrome.

DNA repair

Currently, mutations in four genes are recognized as causing the TTD phenotype, namely TTDN1, XPB, XPD and TTDA.  Individuals with defects in XPB, XPD and TTDA are photosensitive, whereas those with a defect in TTDN1 are not.  The three genes, XPB, XPD and TTDA, encode protein components of the multi-subunit transcription/repair factor IIH (TFIIH).  This complex factor is an important decision maker in NER that opens the DNA double helix after damage is initially recognized.  NER is a multi-step pathway that removes a variety of different DNA damages that alter normal base pairing, including both UV-induced damages and bulky chemical adducts.  Features of premature aging often occur in individuals with mutational defects in genes specifying protein components of the NER pathway, including those with TTD (see DNA damage theory of aging).

Diagnosis

Treatment

See also
 Skin lesion
 List of cutaneous conditions

References

External links 
 NIH document on Tay syndrome

Genodermatoses
Autosomal recessive disorders
Congenital disorders
Rare diseases
Syndromes
DNA replication and repair-deficiency disorders
Progeroid syndromes